The College Quarterly is a peer-reviewed academic journal established in 1993 and published by Seneca College in Toronto, Ontario. The journal publishes scholarly articles and book reviews from a wide variety of academic fields related to teaching and learning and higher education policy issues in North America.

References

External links 

 

Academic journals published in Canada
English-language journals
Publications established in 1993
Education journals